TAG Mobile is a wireless telecommunications provider based in Dallas, Texas, United States. It is an Eligible Telecommunications Carrier (ETC) wireless and facilities provider in 19 states of the United States. The TAG Mobile ‘Lifeline Program’ provides cell phones to those in the low-income category and also individuals on government assistance programs in the US.

Lifeline Program for Low-Income Consumers is a government assistance program. Eligible subscribers who meet the requirements such as receiving government assistance or a household income that is below 135-175% of the federal poverty level (dependent upon the state) can avail this service. The typical Lifeline phone customer gets a free cell phone, plus free voice minutes and text messaging every month.

Eligibility requirements vary from state to state but the most commonly included eligibility criteria are:
 Supplemental Nutrition Assistance Program(SNAP) 
 Medicaid (not Medicare)
 Supplemental Security Income (SSI)
 Low-Income Home Energy Assistance Program (LIHEAP)

The TAG Mobile Lifeline Program provides –  Free Mobile Phone, 500 Monthly domestic minutes of talk, International calling minutes and Unlimited global messaging.

Consumers also have the option of BYOD (Bring Your Own Device) using either their previously owned or purchased phone (if compatible with the TAG Mobile Network) or getting an upgraded smartphone from TAG Mobile for use with their Lifeline supported service.

TAG Mobile operates on the T-Mobile, Verizon, and Sprint Networks.
Lifeline in Colorado utilizes the T-Mobile (T-Mobile US, Inc.) network.

References

Telecommunications companies of the United States
Mobile phone companies of the United States